West Wardsboro is an unincorporated village in the town of Wardsboro, Windham County, Vermont, United States. West Wardsboro has a post office with ZIP code 05360.

References

Unincorporated communities in Windham County, Vermont
Unincorporated communities in Vermont